The Wisconsin–Whitewater Warhawks football program is the intercollegiate American football team for the University of Wisconsin–Whitewater located in the U.S. state of Wisconsin. The team competes in the NCAA Division III and are members of the Wisconsin Intercollegiate Athletic Conference. Wisconsin–Whitewater's first football team was fielded in 1889. The team plays its home games at the 13,500 seat Perkins Stadium in Whitewater, Wisconsin. The Warhawks are coached by Head Coach Jace Rindahl.

History
The Warhawks compete in the WIAC conference of NCAA Division III football. In the 2005 and 2006 seasons, they finished the year undefeated in regular season play, losing only in the Amos Alonzo Stagg Bowls of 2005 and 2006 to the University of Mount Union (then Mount Union College), under former coach and UW-Whitewater alum Bob Berezowitz (UW-Whitewater 1967), who had quarterbacked the UW-Whitewater team as the runner-up in the 1966 National Association of Intercollegiate Athletics playoffs. Following the 2006 season, Berezowitz retired, and alum and former assistant Lance Leipold (UW-Whitewater 1987) was named Warhawk head coach. The Warhawks opened the 2007 with a victory, then suffered their first regular-season defeat since 2004, 26-16 to NCAA Division II's St. Cloud State. The Warhawks followed this up by going undefeated through the remainder of the season. After finishing the regular season with a 9-1 record and a third consecutive 7-0 WIAC record, the UW–Whitewater Warhawks entered the NCAA Division III playoffs for the third consecutive time. The Warhawks won four home playoff games, including a Dec. 8 repeat home victory over Mary Hardin-Baylor 16-7 in the semi-finals, to earn their third straight trip to the NCAA Division III Championship Game, the Amos Alonzo Stagg Bowl in Salem, Virginia and set up their third championship game against Mount Union College. On Dec. 15, 2007 the Warhawks beat Mount Union 31-21 to win the Division III title and close the 2007 season 14-1. Warhawk running back Justin Beaver won the John Gagliardi Trophy for his performance both on and off the field.

The Warhawks entered the 2008 playoffs with one loss after a last-second loss to UW-Stevens Point that ended UW-Whitewater's WIAC win streak at 27 games. Despite having to travel for some of their playoff contests, the Warhawks won four playoff games, earning a spot in the Stagg Bowl after a victory over Mary Hardin-Baylor 39-13. On Dec. 20, 2008 the Warhawks lost to Mount Union 31-26 in their fourth consecutive Stagg Bowl matchup.

The Warhawks ran the table in 2009 with a perfect record of 15-0, defeating Mount Union in the Stagg Bowl 38-28 to claim their second national title in three years. The string continued in 2010, including a sixth straight WIAC title, and ending with UW-Whitewater’s third NCAA III championship in four years, with a 31-21 win over Mount Union in the Stagg Bowl to finish 15-0 and run the NCAA (all divisions) leading win streak to 30 games. Once again, in 2011, they ran the regular season undefeated, with a seventh straight WIAC title. They then went on the face Mount Union in the Stagg Bowl for the seventh straight season, and won their third straight title, fourth in five years to finish 15-0 again. They raised their win streak to 45 games, which is just 2 behind Oklahoma's historic Division I streak, and is fourth behind Mount Union's separate 55 and 54 game winning streaks in all of college football.

In 2013, the Warhawks faced off with the Purple Raiders of Mount Union in the Stagg Bowl for the eighth time in nine seasons. UW-Whitewater, led by junior quarterback Matt Behrendt, would go on to win by a final score of 52-14 and secure their fifth National Championship, and fourth undefeated season, under coach Leipold.

On December 19, 2014 the Warhawks and Mount Union met again in the Stagg Bowl; the Warhawks won the NCAA DIII Football title over the Raiders, 43-34. This was Leipold's final game as Warhawks head coach, as he had already been announced as the new head coach at Division I FBS school Buffalo.

Kevin Bullis was introduced on February 4, 2015 as the 21st head coach of the Warhawks. The former UW-Whitewater assistant had spent eight years as the defensive line coach and run defense coordinator. The Warhawks finished the 2015 season as runner-up in the WIAC behind UW-Oshkosh, who they lost 10-7 on October 10. The Warhawks got revenge against the Titans, beating them 31-29 in the 3rd round of the NCAA DIII Playoffs. The Warhawks would go on to lose the next week 36-6 to the Mount Union Raiders in the NCAA DIII Semifinals. The Warhawks finished the season 12-2.

In 2016, the Warhawks won their 35th conference title on the way to a perfect regular season. The season highlight was a come-from-behind 17-14 victory over the UW-Oshkosh Titans. The game set the DIII on-campus attendance record with 17,535 people in attendance. The Warhawks perfect season ended in round 3 of the NCAA DIII playoffs, losing to John Carroll University, the same team who three weeks earlier ended Mount Union's 117 Regular Season win streak, by a score of 31-14.

In 2017, the team started the season 0-2 for the first time since 2001. After a WIAC season opening loss to UW-Oshkosh, their record fell to 1-3. The Warhawks then rattled off six-straight victories, giving them a final record of 7-3. The substandard season left the Warhawks out of the playoffs for only the second time since 2005.

In 2019 The Warhawks went 9-1 in the regular season, winning the WIAC. In the playoffs they beat Monmouth (ILL) 35-10, then Wartburg 41-28 at home in the first two rounds of the Division III football playoff. For the quarterfinals UW-Whitewater had to travel to Belton, Texas, to play Mary Hardin-Baylor the Warhawks beat the Crusaders 26-7. For the semifinal game UW-Whitewater played another home game against St. Thomas (MINN) winning 35-32 on a go-ahead field goal with 2:10 left in the game. This win clinched the Warhawks 10th appearance in the Stagg Bowl, second most all-time in Division III history. The team would go on to lose to North Central in the 2019 Stagg Bowl.  

Two years later, the team appeared in the conference semifinals, but lost to Mary Hardin-Baylor. It was their only loss of the season, as they went 10-0 in the regular season.

Notable former players
 Derek Stanley
 Matt Turk
 Matt Blanchard
 Jake Kumerow
 Quinn Meinerz
 Lance Leipold
 Max Meylor

References

External links
 

 
American football teams established in 1889
1889 establishments in Wisconsin